Random match probability (RMP) is a statistic in population genetics used to measure the probability of an unrelated person, randomly picked out of the population having a genotype that matches the genotype of another individual. In forensic DNA analysis the genotype used to determine RMP is derived from an evidence sample. 

To calculate a random match probability, first use a population database to find allele frequencies for the different alleles present at a locus. Databases that account for different subgroups within a population are necessary for RMP because some alleles are more common within certain ethnic/racial group than in others. This means that the random match probability for someone of Caucasian descent could be different than the random match probability for someone of African American descent, even with the same genotype. Using the appropriate database, multiply the frequencies of the alleles present at the target loci to get the RMP at that locus. When the genotype is homozygous at that locus then use the squared value of the frequency for its RMP. When the genotype is heterozygous at a locus multiply the different frequencies together, then by two for the RMP. Multiply the RMP of each locus together to get the overall RMP for the genetic profile derived from the evidence. 

In forensic science, evidence from the crime scene is gathered and when DNA is present a genetic profile may be found. The genotypes in the profile or profiles found can then be matched with a suspect or used to exclude a suspect. The RMP is useful for the jury because it gives a numeric value to measure how small the chance is that a random individual contributed to the DNA in the evidence and not the suspect. RMP is used as a tool to measure the rarity of a genetic profile and not as a statement toward the innocence or guilt of a suspect.

See also 
Random man not excluded

References 

Population genetics